Okka Kshanam is a 2017 Indian Telugu-language science fiction action thriller film directed by Vi Anand and produced by Chakri Chigurupati under Lakshmi Narasimha Entertainments banner. The film stars Allu Sirish, Surbhi, Srinivas Avasarala, and Seerat Kapoor. The film deals with a parallel life concept where the protagonist fights against his own destiny, fate and time. It highly borrows from Alfred Hitchcock's Rear Window.

The film's cinematography is by Shyam K Naidu, while the score and soundtrack is composed by Mani Sharma. The film is released worldwide on 28 December 2017 to mixed reviews from critics and audience. The film was later dubbed and released in Hindi as Shoorveer 2 in 2019 and also dubbed in Malayalam as Parallel Crime in 2020.

Plot  
The story starts off with a couple in a parking lot. They have a son Jeeva, who finds Jyotsana aka Jo in the mall and they fall in love, with Jo giving him her number. Jo invites Jeeva to her house where she tells him that her favourite hobby is observing others and she had recently been focusing on a couple, Srinivas and Swathi, who are in constant feuds. Jo thinks that Srinivas is abusive. Later Jeeva invites Jo to his house. Jo realises that Jeeva is completely frank and open with his parents. As she was about to propose to Jeeva, a metal roof cuts Jeeva's hand. Upon Jo's request, Jeeva starts to follow Srinivas, talk to him while he is drunk and gets to know his love story. Both Jeeva and Jo are utterly shocked to know that both their stories are one and the same. Jo once notices Srinivas taking an unconscious Swathi in his car to an unknown location. Fearing the worst, Jeeva and Jo break into his house and while searching, they discover the file of a psychiatrist, further confirming Jo's suspicions about Srinivas. But Jeeva reveals a shocking fact about the file, which belonged to Swathi, not Srinivas and the health conditions of Jo and Swathi are one and the same. They later meet a famous scientist, who explains with a matchbox that both the couples are experiencing a rare phenomenon, Parallel Life, meaning that whatever events Srinivas and Swathi experienced in the past, will be experienced by Jo and Jeeva right now and if they try to make any changes, events supposed to happen in the future most likely happen now. 

They fearfully return to Jo's apartment, where they are surprised to know that Swathi was murdered and Srinivas accepted his role in it. Fearing the same might happen to them, Jo breaks up with Jeeva. However his mother convinces him to not give up. He visits Srinivas in prison for many days, and finally convinces him to explain what happened after marriage. Srinivas explains that one day Swathi was headed to meet him, where an accident occurs and many children in an ambulance had died. She blames Srinivas for the accident and ends up depressed, taking an overdose and falling unconscious the day Jo saw them in the car. Swathi was admitted in Olympus Hospitals. That day when Srinivas reaches home, he finds Swathi with her throat slit and she dies. Jeeva later gets a call from Jo telling she wants to attempt suicide, but admits she was not brave enough to do so. From this fact, Jeeva realises that a third person might be involved in Swathi's murder. Taking help from a garbage thief in Jo's locality, Jeeva learns that another person had infiltrated Srinivas's house after it was sealed, and took the hard disk from their computer, and the infiltrator was supposed to meet someone at 7:00 P.M. Meanwhile Jeeva takes help from Jo's brother-in-law to find out the car that happened to be in between Jo's and Jeeva's car in the start of the story, and does the same for Srinivas and Swathi. They both realise that both cars belong to the one person, and the infiltrator also works for the same person, T.S.Tarun, who is the MD of Olympus Hospitals. They finally deduce that Olympus Hospitals played a major role in Swathi's murder, but wonder how Tarun is related to Jo.

Meanwhile, Jo gets access to Swathi's mail. She observes that the last mail was a video clip, which reveals the truth behind her murder and the accident that occurred before her depression. While she was admitted in Olympus Hospitals, she remembers that the dead children were in an ambulance from the same hospital and asks the receptionist about it. The receptionist grows suspicious of Swathi and informs the chief doctor. However, Swathi eavesdrops on their conversation and forcefully extracts the truth from her where the nurse reveals that the children in the ambulance were already dead due to ventilator power shortage, and their death was pinned as an accident. After knowing the truth about the accident, she records it all in a video clip and sends it to Srinivas and has become Tarun's target, who sent his henchman and killed her. Meanwhile, Tarun appoints two hackers to delete the video clip. But upon realising that Jo had already seen and downloaded the video clip, he sends his henchman to kill Jo, but she escapes and calls Jeeva, who realises that she is now going along the same road that Swathi did. Jeeva tells her to change her direction, which she does, evading another accident. However, the henchman knocks her out and kidnap her. She is kept in a building under construction. Jeeva manages to free her, but Tarun slits her throat, putting her life at stake. Jeeva finally kills Tarun and saves Jo in the last moment. They prove that Olympus Hospitals is guilty of both the accident and murder of Swathi, and Srinivas is exonerated from all charges and released from prison.

Cast
 Allu Sirish as Jeeva aka Jee
 Surbhi as Jyothsna aka Jo
 Seerat Kapoor as Swathi
 Srinivas Avasarala as Srinivas
  Arun Kumar Dasari as Olympus Hospital MD T. S. Tarun (Voice dubbed by Hemachandra)
 Jayaprakash as Scientist
 Kasi Viswanath as Ramakrishna, Jeeva's father
 Rohini as Jeeva's mother
 Praveen as Paparao aka Puppy, Jo's brother-in-law
 Snigdha as Snigdha, Jo's friend
 Prabhas Sreenu as Dasari Raghvendra Rao, waiter and customer at the bar Srinivas used to visit
 Satya as Satyam, a thief
 Chammak Chandra as Traffic Police Officer

Production
The film met with trouble for a brief period of time over the allegations that the film borrows the script from a Korean film titled Parallel Life. Another producer Anil Sunkara reportedly had already brought the remake rights of the same film for his next production venture, 2 Memiddaram. Prior to the release, it was assumed that the story line of Okka Kshanam closely followed the same path, Sunkara allegedly filed a complaint against the makers with the film chamber. However, once the producer saw the film and understood the same and even wished the team good luck for release on his official Twitter page. Post release, it was cleared that Vi Anand’ s story and the screenplay was original. The director was also unanimously appreciated for his screenwriting in the film.

Soundtrack

Music was composed by Mani Sharma and was released on Lahari Music.

References

External links

2017 films
2010s Telugu-language films
Films shot in Andhra Pradesh
Films set in Andhra Pradesh
2010s science fiction thriller films
2017 science fiction action films
2010s romantic thriller films
Indian science fiction thriller films
Indian science fiction action films
Indian romantic thriller films
Films scored by Mani Sharma
Films shot in Bangalore